Herman Lee O'Berry (born July 11, 1971) is a former American football defensive back in the National Football League. He played nine games for the St. Louis Rams in 1996. He played college football for the Oregon Ducks.

References

1971 births
Living people
American football defensive backs
St. Louis Rams players
Oregon Ducks football players
Players of American football from Sacramento, California